Peking University Founder Technology College (北大方正软件职业技术学院) is a general vocational institution organized by the Beijing University Founder Group Corporation. The institution has national recognition of educational qualifications of full-time courses.

References

External links
Peking University Founder Technology College

Peking University